Tempietto (Italian: "small temple") generally means a small temple-like or pavilion-like structure and is a name of many places in Italy:

 San Pietro in Montorio#The Tempietto in Rome, a tomb by Donato Bramante
 Villa Barbaro#Church (Tempietto Barbaro) at Maser, a church planned by Palladio
 Tempietto of Sant'Antonio, Rimini, a baroque church in Rimini
 Temple of Aesculapius (Villa Borghese) (called also Tempietto of Aesculapius) in Rome, built by Antonio Asprucci and his son Mario Asprucci
 Temple of Clitumnus or Tempietto del Clitunno, an early medieval church in Pissignano
 Tempietto del Petrarca, Canossa, a commemorative structure in Selvapiana
 Sant'Emidio alle Grotte or Tempietto, a Baroque church in Ascoli Piceno
 Sant'Emidio Rosso or Tempietto Sant'Emidio Rosso, a church of Ascoli Piceno
 Sanctuary of Santa Maria infra Saxa, Genga and Tempietto Valadier by Giuseppe Valadier
 Oratorio di Santa Maria in Valle, previously called the Tempietto longobardo, Valle
 Pitigliano#Tempietto, a cave in Pitigliano
 Tempietto di Santa Croce (Bergamo), small Romanesque chapel, Bergamo
 Tempietto di San Fedelino sul Lago Mezzola, 10th to 11th-century small church in Via San Fedelino
 Rucellai Sepulchre or Tempietto del Santo Sepolcro or Tempietto Rucellai, a funerary chapel inside of the church of San Pancrazio, Florence